Gyula Lóránt (born Gyula Lipovics, 6 February 1923 – 31 May 1981) was a Hungarian footballer and manager of Croatian descent. He played as a defender and midfielder for, among others, UTA Arad, Vasas SC, Honvéd and Hungary.

During the 1950s, he was a prominent member of the legendary Hungarian national team known as the Mighty Magyars, which also included Ferenc Puskás, Zoltán Czibor, Sándor Kocsis, József Bozsik and Nándor Hidegkuti.

After retiring as a player, Lóránt became a coach, most notably with Honvéd, FC Bayern Munich and PAOK Thessaloniki FC. While at PAOK, he guided them to a Greek Championship title in 1976. On 31 May 1981, while still working as coach, he suffered a heart attack, watching PAOK play Olympiacos CFP and died at the game, aged 58.

Early life
The son of a policeman, who fought as a volunteer in World War II on the German side, Lóránt turned professional footballer at the age of 16; in parallel, he then also studied economics at university in the 1950s.

Gyula Lóránt began his career as a youth with his hometown club, Kõszeg SE, after encouragement from a local trainer. He then played for Nagyváradi AC and UT Arad in Romania. It was while at Vasas SC, where his teammates included Ladislao Kubala, that his career prospered. However, in January 1949, as Hungary became a communist state, Kubala fled the country in the back of a truck and formed his own team Hungaria to play exhibition friendlies. The team was made up of fellow refugees fleeing Eastern Europe. Lóránt also attempted to escape and follow Kubala, but was captured and ended up in a detention camp.

Hungarian international
Lóránt was released from detention after the intervention of Gusztáv Sebes, the national team coach, who regarded him as pivotal to his plans. Lóránt then made his debut for Hungary on 19 October 1949 in an away game against Austria. Sebes personally guaranteed the country's Interior Minister and future Prime Minister, János Kádár, that Lóránt would not abscond while in Vienna. Kádár agreed and Lóránt responded with a superb performance as Hungary won 4–3. He subsequently joined Honvéd where together with six of his fellow internationals, he helped the team win three Hungarian League titles. As one of the legendary Mighty Magyars, he helped Hungary become Olympic Champions in 1952, Central European Champions in 1953, defeat England twice and reach the 1954 World Cup final.

Death
Lóránt died on 31 May 1981, while working as a trainer of PAOK, during a game against Olympiacos CFP. He suffered a heart attack in the 16th minute of the match after PAOK's Giorgos Koudas headed a cross into the side of the net from close range. He was tried to be resuscitated on the spot and then moved to the club doctor's room but died before the ambulance arrived. PAOK players were told in the break that he had to be transported to the hospital and his death was revealed only after the game. PAOK eventually won the match 1–0 with the goal of the substitute Vassilis Vasilakos who sat next to Lóránt on the bench when he collapsed. The autopsy revealed that he had at least two more previous heart attacks, the second one at longest one week before his death.

Lóránt was buried in Endingen, Germany, but in 2011 at the request of his widow, his ashes were transported to Hungary and reburied in his birth town, Kőszeg.

Player

Hungary
 Olympic Champions: 1952
 Central European Champions: 1953
 World Cup runner-up: 1954

Nagyváradi AC
 Hungarian Champions: 1944

UTA Arad
 Romanian Champions: 1947

Honvéd
 Hungarian Champions: 1952, 1954, 1955

Manager

PAOK Thessaloniki FC
 Greek Champions: 1976

References

External links
 Bio at www.uefa.com
 Hungary Stats
 Gyula Lóránt Greek

Sources
 Behind The Curtain – Travels in Eastern European Football: Jonathan Wilson (2006) 
 Gyula Lóránt at eintracht-archiv.de

1923 births
1981 deaths
20th-century Hungarian people
Hungarian footballers
Hungary international footballers
Hungarian football managers
Hungarian people of Croatian descent
Footballers at the 1952 Summer Olympics
Olympic footballers of Hungary
Olympic gold medalists for Hungary
1954 FIFA World Cup players
CA Oradea players
Vasas SC players
Budapest Honvéd FC players
FC UTA Arad players
Budapest Honvéd FC managers
Debreceni VSC managers
1. FC Kaiserslautern managers
Eintracht Frankfurt managers
PAOK FC managers
FC Schalke 04 managers
FC Bayern Munich managers
Expatriate football managers in West Germany
Hungarian expatriate sportspeople in West Germany
Expatriate football managers in Greece
Hungarian expatriate sportspeople in Greece
Expatriate footballers in Romania
Hungarian expatriate sportspeople in Romania
Liga I players
1. FC Köln managers
MSV Duisburg managers
Bundesliga managers
People from Kőszeg
Olympic medalists in football
Medalists at the 1952 Summer Olympics
Association football defenders
Association football midfielders
Freiburger FC managers
Sportspeople from Vas County